Karin Barbro Elisabet Eriksson (later Flodström, born 5 September 1943) is a retired Swedish breaststroke swimmer. She competed at the 1960 Summer Olympics in the 200 m event, but failed to reach the final.

References

1943 births
Living people
Swedish female breaststroke swimmers
Olympic swimmers of Sweden
Swimmers at the 1960 Summer Olympics
20th-century Swedish women